You Young-dae is a South Korean taekwondo practitioner.

You won the flyweight gold medal at the 2006 Asian Taekwondo Championships, and earned another gold medal within the same weight class at the 2006 Asian Games. He later moved to Taiwan and trained the Chinese Taipei women's taekwondo team from 2013 to 2019, during the 2014 and 2018 Asian Games. You naturalized as a citizen of the Republic of China in April 2020 without yielding his South Korean citizenship, due to a provision in Taiwanese nationality law for high-level professionals to obtain dual nationality through naturalization.

References

External links
 

Living people
Naturalised citizens of Taiwan
Taekwondo practitioners at the 2006 Asian Games
South Korean emigrants to Taiwan
Asian Games medalists in taekwondo
Asian Games gold medalists for South Korea
South Korean male taekwondo practitioners
Medalists at the 2006 Asian Games
Year of birth missing (living people)